Acarologia is a quarterly, peer-reviewed, open-access scientific journal covering all aspects of acarology. It was established by Marc André and François Grandjean in 1959 to promote research in acarology. The editor-in-chief is Serge Kreiter (INRA, Montpellier).

Abstracting and indexing 
The journal is abstracted and indexed in:
 PASCAL
 Current Awareness in Biological Sciences
 Scopus
 The Zoological Record
 BIOSIS Previews

References

External links 
 

Acarology journals
Quarterly journals
English-language journals
Publications established in 1959
Creative Commons Attribution-licensed journals